Fionnuala Carr is a camogie player from Clonduff, County Down, Northern Ireland. She is the winner of two Soaring Star awards in 2010 and 2011 and an Ashbourne All Star in 2011. She was on the Down team that contested the 2011 Kay Mills Cup final. Her father Ross Carr was an All Ireland football medalist in 1991 and 1994 and her sister Sarah-Louise plays full forward for Down. She attended St Mark's High School Warrenpoint, University of Ulster Jordanstown and University College Cork.

Other awards
Three senior Camogie Leagues and Championships, Dubai sevens.

References

External links
 Camogie.ie Official Camogie Association Website

1981 births
Living people
Down camogie players
Alumni of Ulster University
Alumni of University College Cork
UCC camogie players